Mary Is Coming is the first album released by the band Savoy.  It was a different sound from Paul Waaktaar-Savoy's previous band, a-ha, which had gone on hiatus.  Savoy aimed to be more guitar-oriented.  Mary Is Coming was recorded in Oslo and New York City. The album sold a total of 50,000 copies in Norway and went Gold.  Sales in most other countries were unspectacular, leaving Savoy without a worldwide deal.  The A&R from Warner that signed the band as a spinoff of a-ha had also left the label and a lack of support from them led Savoy to later sign with EMI in Norway.
"Velvet" was re-recorded by a-ha on their 2000 comeback album Minor Earth Major Sky.

Track listing
 "Daylight's Wasting" – 3:00
 "Tears from a Stone" – 4:41
 "Velvet" – 4:38
 "Foolish" – 4:39 
 "Half an Hour's Worth" – 3:15
 "Underground" – 3:54
 "Get Up Now" – 5:21
 "Still I'm on Your Side" – 4:07
 "We Will Never Forget" – 3:13
 "Raise Your Sleepy Head" – 3:31
 "Mary Is Coming" – 4:42
 "Fade" – 2:50
 "October" (B-side of "Velvet") – 3:45

Personnel
Guitars, bass, vocals, keyboards, programming, arrangements: Paul Waaktaar-Savoy.
Rhythm guitars and backing vocals: Lauren Savoy.
Drums and backing vocals: Frode Unneland.
Backing vocals on "Velvet": Simone Larsen.
All songs written by Paul Waaktaar-Savoy & Lauren Savoy.
Produced by: Savoy.
Released by: WEA International Inc. (outside the US).

Charts

References

External links
Album listing on old Savoycentral.com page

1996 debut albums
Savoy (band) albums
Warner Records albums